Zhou Xuhong (born October 1956) is a Chinese physicist and educator. He is the current .  He previously served as president of Chang'an University from May 2002 to July 2006, president of Lanzhou University between May 2006 to June 2013, and president of Chongqing University from June 2013 to December 2017.

He is a member of the Chinese Academy of Engineering.

Biography
Zhou was born and raised in Nan County, Hunan. After high school, he worked at Hunan Beizhouzi Farm, during the Cultural Revolution. After the Resumption of University Entrance Examination in 1977, he entered Hunan University and received his Doctor of Engineering there. After graduating in 1982, he worked as an Assistant Engineer in the Fifth Engineering Bureau of the Chinese Construction. He joined the Department of Civil Engineering faculty of Hunan University in June 1986 and was promoted to professor in May 1996. He served as director of Hunan University's graduate department from September 1997 to August 1999 and the university's vice-president from August 1999 to May 2002.

He became the president of Chang'an University in May 2002, and served until July 2006.

In May 2006, he was appointed the president of Lanzhou University, he remained in that position until June 24, 2013, when he was transferred to Chongqing and appointed the president of Chongqing University.

Zhou was elected a fellow of the Chinese Academy of Engineering in December 2011.

In December 2013, he was recruited by Central South University as an honorary professor.

References

1956 births
People from Nan County
Living people
Hunan University alumni
Members of the Chinese Academy of Engineering
Academic staff of Hunan University
Presidents of Chang'an University
Presidents of Lanzhou University
Presidents of Chongqing University
Physicists from Hunan
Educators from Hunan